Southwest Airlines Flight 1455 was a scheduled passenger flight from 
McCarran International Airport, Las Vegas, Nevada, to Burbank-Glendale-Pasadena Airport, Burbank, California, that overran the runway during landing on March 5, 2000. The aircraft, a Boeing 737-3T5, registration  came to rest on a city street adjacent to a gas station. The National Transportation Safety Board found that the incident was due to the pilots attempting to land with excessive speed. They also found that the air traffic controller placed them in a position from which their only option was a go around. Two of the passengers were seriously injured, and there were many minor injuries. As a result of the incident, the airport installed an Engineered Materials Arrestor System (EMAS) at the east end of the incident runway. The aircraft was written off, making the incident the 10th hull loss of a Boeing 737-300. This was the first major accident in the airline's 29-year history.

Aircraft and crew 

The aircraft was a 15 year old Boeing 737-3T5 (registration ). The 737 was one of the oldest aircraft in Southwest's fleet, having been originally built for Orion Airways in 1984. The aircraft was powered by two CFM International CFM56-3B1 turbofan engines.

The captain was 52-year-old Howard Peterson, who had been with Southwest Airlines since 1988 and had logged 11,000 flight hours, including 9,870 hours on the Boeing 737. The first officer was 43-year-old Jeffrey D. Erwin, who had been with Southwest Airlines since 1995 and had 5,032 flight hours, with 2,522 of them on the Boeing 737.

Peterson served as a pilot in the U.S. Air Force from 1970 to 1975, then flew for United Airlines from 1975 to 1977, and then flew for Wien Air Alaska from 1977 to 1979, and also flew for Coleman Air Transport from 1979 to 1980, before flying for EG&G from 1980 to 1988. Erwin also served as a pilot in the U.S. Air Force from 1983 to 1995.

Accident
Flight 1455 departed McCarran International Airport (LAS), Las Vegas, Nevada, at 1650, more than 2 hours behind schedule due to inclement weather in the area. The controller later informed the captain to place the aircraft into the approach pattern between two other flights. The captain acknowledged the instructions.

At 18:04:42 the first officer informed the captain that the target airspeed for landing would be . This value was based on standard procedures in the Southwest Airlines Flight Operations Manual (FOM).

At 1808 the controller cleared flight 1455 for a visual approach to runway 8 with a restriction to remain at or above 3,000 feet (above mean sea level) until passing the Van Nuys VOR beacon.

According to the Aeronautical Information Manual Section 4-4-12f, this approach clearance automatically canceled any previous speed assignments.

Additionally, call-outs are required if certain parameters are not met, in this case flight speed and sink rate.

At 18:10:24 the ground proximity warning system (GPWS) began to sound a "sink rate" warning in the cockpit. The aircraft was descending at an angle of 7 degrees, when the angle of descent for most aircraft landing on that runway was 3 or 4 degrees. Both pilots ignored the warnings.  At 18:10:44 the warning system in the cockpit began to sound. The captain responded to these warnings with "that's all right."

The captain stated after the accident that he knew as the aircraft passed  that he was not "in the slot," meaning the conditions had not been met for a safe landing, in this case because of an excessive airspeed. The captain further stated that he understood that if he was not "in the slot," procedures demanded a go-around maneuver to abort the landing. He could not explain why he did not perform a go-around maneuver. The first officer likewise indicated after the accident that he was aware that they were not "in the slot," but said he believed the captain was taking corrective action.

Furthermore, it touched down  from the runway threshold,  beyond the  range established by the Southwest Airlines FOM. The captain deployed the thrust reversers and then he and the first officer applied manual brakes, but according to later NTSB findings, under those conditions even maximum braking would not have prevented the aircraft from overrunning the end of the runway.

Unable to stop in time, the Boeing 737 overran the end of Runway 8. It finally came to rest on Hollywood Way, a four-lane city street, near a Chevron gas station. The nose section and front landing gear were sheared off, but otherwise the fuselage remained intact and there was no compromise of the cabin area. However, the 737 sustained structural damage from the accident and was later scrapped.

The cockpit voice recorder captured the flight's captain remarking, "Well, there goes my career," moments after the accident.

Investigation
The NTSB concluded that the probable cause for the accident was excessive flight speed and the steep angle of the glidepath (7 degrees, as opposed to the 3 degrees normally used for both visual and instrument approaches), and the flight crew's failure to abort the approach when conditions were not met for a stable approach and landing. The action of the flight controller was listed as a contributing factor in the accident: "Contributing to the accident was the controller's positioning of the airplane in such a manner as to leave no safe options for the flight crew other than a go-around maneuver."

Months later, the pilots were fired as a result of this incident. Southwest Airlines admitted the pilots' actions were negligent.

At the time, a Southwest spokesperson termed it "the worst accident" in the airline's history. Air safety experts and pilots suggested the accident was an example of a situation where "fast, steep, unstabilized approaches" are dangerous, and of how inadequate the safety margins around the Burbank runways are (as well as similar U.S. airports).

The gas station missed by the aircraft was later closed and demolished due to safety concerns. The lot became dedicated green space.

Injuries
Of the 142 people on board, 2 passengers sustained serious injuries; 41 passengers and the captain sustained minor injuries; and 94 passengers, 3 flight attendants, and the first officer sustained no injuries. The airplane sustained extensive exterior damage and some internal damage to the passenger cabin.

The 737 struck a vehicle on Hollywood Way, pinning the vehicle's hood under the aircraft. However, the vehicle's two occupants (the driver and her four-year-old daughter) were not injured. No other ground injuries were reported.

During the accident sequence, the forward service door (1R) escape slide inflated inside the airplane; the nose gear collapsed; and the forward dual flight attendant jumpseat, which was occupied by two flight attendants, partially collapsed.

The inflated escape slide blocked both forward doors from being used to evacuate the aircraft, and prevented two flight attendants seated on the forward jumpseat from assisting the evacuation. There was no fire, but had there been a fire, this malfunctioning slide would have dramatically affected the survivability of the occupants. As a result of this occurrence, the NTSB issued a safety recommendation to replace the slide cover latch brackets on forward slide compartments of all older Boeing 737 models with the latch brackets installed on later models.

Subsequent safety measures 

As with runway 4R/22L at the Little Rock National Airport, site of the American Airlines Flight 1420 overrun accident, runway 8/26 in Burbank was exempt from the  runway safety area standard. The NTSB cited this accident in a recommendation for installing the engineered materials arrestor system (EMAS) at airports where it is not feasible to establish the  runway safety area (RSA). A US $4,000,000 EMAS was subsequently installed as a result of this accident at Burbank airport.

On Friday, October 13, 2006, the Burbank EMAS stopped a private jet with no injuries or aircraft damage.

On December 6, 2018, it stopped a Southwest 737-700 (N752SW), with 117 people on board. There were no injuries and no damage to the aircraft.

Dispute with city of Burbank
Burbank city officials demanded that Southwest Airlines pay their $40,000 bill for services, including overtime for police officers and firefighters, related to the March 5, 2000, accident. Southwest refused to pay stating that the airline is entitled to emergency services since it pays taxes to the city.

See also

Engineered materials arrestor system
Ground effect (aerodynamics)
Runway safety area
Southwest Airlines Flight 1248 — Chicago Midway International Airport overrun accident on December 8, 2005.
TAM Airlines Flight 3054 — A similar runway overrun crash that occurred 7 years later where an Airbus A320 landed on a wet runway and hit a gas station, killing all 187 onboard and 12 on the ground.

References

External links 
 NTSB investigation docket

Airliner accidents and incidents in California
Airliner accidents and incidents involving runway overruns
Airliner accidents and incidents caused by pilot error
2000 in California
Aviation accidents and incidents in the United States in 2000
1455
Accidents and incidents involving the Boeing 737 Classic
Burbank, California
2000 in Los Angeles
Disasters in Los Angeles
March 2000 events in the United States